The Asian American Literature Festival is a biannual Washington, D.C.–based literary festival dedicated to sharing and growing Asian American literature. It was first held in 2017.

History 
The Asian American Literature Festival is an event produced by the Smithsonian Asian Pacific American Center.

The first Asian American Literature Festival was held in 2017 at the National Portrait Gallery, Library of Congress, and The Phillips Collection. Major guests included Kazim Ali, Li-Young Lee, Karen Tei Yamashita. The second Asian American Literature Festival was held in 2019 at the Eaton D.C. and The Library of Congress. Major guests included Kaveh Akbar, Monique Truong, and Arthur Sze.

References 

Literary festivals in the United States
Asian-American literature